David Butlion (16 December 1944 – 8 March 2005) was a South African cricketer. He played in three List A matches for Eastern Province from 1969/70 to 1973/74.

See also
 List of Eastern Province representative cricketers

References

External links
 

1944 births
2005 deaths
South African cricketers
Eastern Province cricketers
Place of birth missing